The Crosby system was an FM stereophonic broadcasting standard developed by Murray G. Crosby. In the United States, it competed with, and ultimately lost to, the Zenith/GE system, which the FCC chose as the standard in 1961.

While both systems used multiplexing to transmit the L-R stereo signal, the Crosby system used a frequency-modulated 50 kHz subcarrier, whereas the competing Zenith/GE system used an amplitude-modulated 38 kHz subcarrier. As FM is less susceptible to interference and noise than AM, the Crosby system had better frequency response and less noise of the two systems especially under weak signal conditions. However, the Crosby system was incompatible with existing subsidiary communications authorization (SCA) services which used subcarrier frequencies including 41 and 67 kHz. These SCA services were used by many FM stations since the mid-1950s for subscription-based "storecasting" to raise revenue and for other non-broadcast purposes. They consequently lobbied the FCC to adopt the Zenith/GE system. FCC tests in 1960 confirmed that the Zenith/GE stereo system was compatible with 67 kHz SCA operation, although not 41 kHz.

According to Jack Hannold:

On April 19, 1961, the FCC released its Final Order selecting the Zenith/GE system as the FM stereophonic broadcasting standard. At 9:59 AM that day, Crosby-Teletronics stock was worth $15 a share; by 2:00 P.M. it was down to less than $2.50. Another (albeit relatively minor) factor in the FCC choosing the Zenith/GE system was the widespread use of vacuum tubes in radios at the time; the additional tubes for an all-FM system would have increased the size, weight, cost of and heat generated by each tuner or receiver.

References

Nichols, Roger: I Can't Keep Up With All The Formats, 2003 (copy at the Internet Archive).
Schoenherr, Steven E.: Stereophonic Sound, 1999-2001 (on the website of the Audio Engineering Society)

External links
Beaubien, William H.: A Report of FM Stereo at the CCIR Study Group X Conference in Bad Kreuznach, Germany JAES Volume 11 Issue 1 pp. 2-5; January 1963 

Broadcasting standards